

Events

Works published

Births
1040:
 Muhammad Ibn Abbad Al Mutamid (died 1095), Arabic poet in Al-Andalus

1046:
 Masud Sa'd Salman (died 1121), Persian

1048:
 May 31: Omar Khayyám (died 1123), Persian polymath, mathematician, philosopher, astronomer and poet
 Mu'izzi (died 1125), Persian
 Am'aq (died 1148), Persian that carried the title amir al-shu'ara ("Amir of poets")

Deaths
1040:
 Unsuri (born unknown), Persian poet of the royal court, given the title Malik-us Shu'ara (King of Poets')
 Asjadi (born unknown), Persian
 Manuchehri (born unknown), Persian, later a royal poet in the court of Sultan Shihab ud-Dawlah Mas'ud I of Ghazni

1041:
 Akazome Emon 赤染衛門 (born 956), Japanese waka poet who lived in the mid-Heian period; a member of both the Thirty-six Elder Poetic Sages and Fujiwara no Kintō's 36 female poetry immortals (or "sages") of the Kamakura period (surname: Akazome)
 Fujiwara no Kintō (born 966), Japanese poet, publisher of the Shūi Wakashū; he created the concept of the Thirty-six Poetry Immortals

1049:
 Abū-Sa'īd Abul-Khayr (born 967), Persian
 Uthman Mukhtari (born unknown), Persian

See also

 Poetry
 11th century in poetry
 11th century in literature
 List of years in poetry

Other events:
 Other events of the 12th century
 Other events of the 13th century

11th century:
 11th century in poetry
 11th century in literature

Notes

11th-century poetry
Poetry